LYPA or Lypa may refer to:

 Yurii Lypa (1900-1944), Ukrainian writer, poet, social and political leader, translator and medical practitioner
 Ivan Lypa (1865-1923), Ukrainian writer, doctor, and political activist; see Brotherhood of Tarasovs
 , a left tributary of Styr, Ukraine
LYPA, ICAO code for Pančevo Airport, Serbia 
LYPA, callsign of Lithuanian warwhip Žemaitis, originally Danish warship HDMS Flyvefisken (P550)

See also
Lipa (disambiguation)